Kyundaw may refer to several places in Burma:

Kyundaw, Banmauk
Kyundaw, Mingin
Kyundaw, Shwegu
Kyundaw, Yinmabin